Edward Khmara (born 1944) is an American screenwriter, actor and producer. He is best known for his work on Enemy Mine, Ladyhawke and Dragon: The Bruce Lee Story.

Biographer
Khmara was born in 1944, in Los Angeles, California. His immigrant parents spoke Russian at home.

Credits

Writer 
"Enemy Mine" (1985)
"Ladyhawke" (1985)
"Dragon: The Bruce Lee Story" (1993)
"Merlin" (TV Mini-Series) (1998)
"Submerged" (TV Movie, teleplay) (2001)
"Las Vegas New Mexico 1875" (Short) (2008) – storyline consultant 
"The Pinkertons and the Carbon Arc Contrivance" (Short) (2011) – story

Actor 
"Las Vegas New Mexico 1875" (Short) (2008) – voice Rangoon Kelly
"Outlaw Justice" (Short) (2009) – Marshal Hudspeth 
"The Pinkertons and the Carbon Arc Contrivance" (Short) (2011) – Judge Force Crater
"The Lone Ranger" (2013) – Sheriff Patterson (uncredited)
"Manhattan" (TV Series, Episode 33) (2015) –  Dwight the Fisherman
"Final Cutz" (2019) – Cherepakha

 Producer 
 "Herowork"  (1977) – associate producer 
 "House of Cards" (1993) – associate producer, as Ed Khmara
 "Black Rose''" (Short) (2013) – associate producer

References

External links
 

American screenwriters
1944 births
Living people